Nils Bertil Täpp (27 October 1917 – 23 October 2000) was a Swedish cross-country skier. He was part of the Swedish 4 × 10 km relay teams that won gold medals at the 1948 Winter Olympics and 1950 FIS Nordic World Ski Championships. At the 1952 Olympics he finished seventh in the individual 18 km race and won a bronze medal in the 4 × 10 km relay. He was the Swedish national champion in the 15 km (1943 and 1946) and 3 × 10 km relay (1942, 1943 and 1949).

He was born Nils Bertil Persson and changed his last name to Täpp in 1945.

Cross-country skiing results

Olympic Games
 2 medals – (1 gold, 1 bronze)

World Championships
 1 medal – (1 gold)

References

External links

Swedish national skiing champions 

1917 births
2000 deaths
People from Malung-Sälen Municipality
Cross-country skiers from Dalarna County
Swedish male cross-country skiers
Olympic cross-country skiers of Sweden
Cross-country skiers at the 1948 Winter Olympics
Cross-country skiers at the 1952 Winter Olympics
Olympic gold medalists for Sweden
Olympic bronze medalists for Sweden
Olympic medalists in cross-country skiing
FIS Nordic World Ski Championships medalists in cross-country skiing
Medalists at the 1948 Winter Olympics
Medalists at the 1952 Winter Olympics